Russell Fry may refer to:

Russell Fry (footballer) (born 1985), English footballer
Russell Fry (politician) (born 1985), South Carolina politician